Pachnephorus fabianae is a species of leaf beetle found in the Republic of the Congo and the Democratic Republic of the Congo, described by Stefano Zoia in 2007. A single specimen of the species from Zambia is also known, but with doubt. It is named after the author's wife, Fabiana.

References

Eumolpinae
Beetles of the Democratic Republic of the Congo
Insects of the Republic of the Congo
Beetles described in 2007